Surinder Singh (born 12 July 1973) is a former Indian football player. He is currently the head coach of Delhi FC. He previously managed Minerva Punjab in I-League 2nd Division.

Coaching career
Born in Chandigarh, Singh began his coaching with the All India Football Federation, working with the national federation's various youth teams. Prior to working with the AIFF, Singh was head coach of the St. Stephen's Football Academy for 23 years, working with future India internationals such as Gurpreet Singh Sandhu, Sandesh Jhingan, Anirudh Thapa, Mohammad Sajid Dhot, and Johny Chand Singh. On 25 December 2011, it was announced that Singh would become the assistant coach of Pailan Arrows of the I-League.

In 2015, Singh became the head coach of Minerva Punjab during the I-League 2nd Division campaign. He led Minerva Punjab to second place in the league, missing promotion over Dempo. In December 2016, it was announced that Minerva Punjab would gain direct-entry into the I-League and that Singh would remain head coach.

After the 2016–17 season, Singh was relieved of his duties as head coach. 2017-19 Surinder Singh was appointed as Technical Director of Minerva FC. For 2020-21 season, he joined Techtro Swades United FC as their Technical Director.

Statistics

Managerial statistics
.

References

External links
 All India Football Federation Profile

1973 births
Living people
Footballers from Chandigarh
Bengal Mumbai FC players
Indian football managers
RoundGlass Punjab FC managers
I-League managers
Association footballers not categorized by position
Indian footballers